Peter Weekes (21 February 1947 – 26 December 1994) was an Australian rules footballer who played with Melbourne in the Victorian Football League (VFL).

Notes

External links 

1947 births
1994 deaths
Australian rules footballers from Victoria (Australia)
Melbourne Football Club players